Region Zealand is the southernmost administrative region of Denmark, established on 1 January 2007 as part of the 2007 Danish Municipal Reform, which abolished the traditional counties ("amter") and set up five larger regions. Zealand Region has 17 municipalities.

Geography
Zealand Region consists of the former counties of Roskilde, Storstrøm, and Vestsjælland. 
The region is named after the island of Sjælland (Zealand), which it shares with the neighbouring Danish Capital Region. Region Zealand (Region Sjælland) also includes the adjacent islands of Lolland, Falster, and Møn.

Municipalities 

The region is subdivided into 17 municipalities:
 Faxe
 Greve
 Guldborgsund
 Holbæk
 Kalundborg
 Køge
 Lejre
 Lolland
 Næstved
 Odsherred
 Ringsted
 Roskilde
 Slagelse
 Solrød
 Sorø
 Stevns
 Vordingborg

Economy 
The Gross domestic product (GDP) of the region was almost €31 billion in 2019, accounting for around 10% of Denmark's economic output. GDP per capita adjusted for purchasing power was 37,000 € or 89% of the EU27 average in the same year.

Regional Council
The five regions of Denmark each have a regional council of 41 members. These are elected every four years, during the local elections.

See also 
Regions of Denmark

References

External links

 
States and territories established in 2007
Regions of Denmark
2007 establishments in Denmark